Fulflej was an alternative rock band from Richmond, Virginia, United States, formed in 1992 by guitarist/vocalist Jae Senji, bassist Awn Drapey, and drummer Spock Jenkins. In 1995, they were signed to Scratchie Records whose releases came to be distributed by Mercury Records beginning in 1996.

Biography

The band evolved from two previous incarnations, the first being The Un-Ones with Senji, Drapey, and drummer Malcom Vaughn, hailing from Hampton, VA and formed in 1986. The Un-Ones was followed by the band Rhithm Lyd, formed in 1990 with Senji, Katie Power on bass, and Phil Searcy on drums. In the summer of 1990, Senji moved to Richmond, VA to attend Virginia Commonwealth University. During breaks, he would return to Hampton where Rhithm Lyd continued with Katie and Phil. Drapey moved back to Hampton after a temporary move to Italy, and replaced Katie as bass player in 1991. Drapey joined Senji in Richmond soon after, and Rhithm Lyd became Fulflej in 1992 with the addition of drummer Spock Jenkins, the Cinnamon Lover. In late 1997, Spock left Earth and was replaced with drummer Ron O'Dell.

Their musical style blends early 1990s alternative rock, math rock, punk, heavy metal, dream pop, and shoegaze.

Soon after being discovered in Richmond by D'arcy Wetsky of the Smashing Pumpkins, they were signed to James Iha (also of the Pumpkins) and D'arcy's newly formed independent record label, Scratchie Records, in 1995. Fulflej's Scratchie releases include the 7-inch "Work In This Universe" b/w "Parallel To Gravity", the EP "The Microwave EP", and the LP "Wack-Ass Tuba Riff".

Mercury Records, who were to distribute the soundtrack for the Power Rangers movie sequel, Turbo: A Power Rangers Movie, invited Fulflej to write and record the theme song for the movie. The result was the track "Shift Into Turbo" which was featured in the movie and on the soundtrack, both released in 1997. The members of Fulflej were also featured performing the song in the TV trailers for the film.

In 1999, Fulflej recorded an additional Scratchie LP, "To Keep A Long Story Long...", though it was never released other than by the band members themselves over the internet after Fulflej had disbanded in 2000.

Discography
Funny Things Shine (cassette demo) (1993)
How to Turn Household Pets Into Easter Bunnies (cassette demo) (1994)
"Work In This Universe" b/w "Parallel To Gravity" (7-inch vinyl single) (1995)
The Microwave EP (5-track EP, CD only) (1995)
Wack-Ass Tuba Riff (12-track LP, CD & cassette) (1996)
Shift Into Turbo (soundtrack single) (1997)
To Keep a Long Story Long... (12-track LP, internet release only) (1999)

Trivia

The instrumental for "Shift Into Turbo" was taken largely from the song "Not A Dream 2" from the "Funny Things Shine" demo.

James Iha and D'arcy Wretzky co-produced and performed on "Wack-Ass Tuba Riff".

A video produced for the single "Work In This Universe" aired several times on MTV during their program, 120 Minutes. Excerpts of the single also appeared on various other MTV programs such as The Real World and Making the Video.

References

Musical groups established in 1986
Musical groups from Virginia
American shoegaze musical groups
Alternative rock groups from Virginia
1986 establishments in Virginia